This is a list of the Iraq national football team results from 1970 to 1979.

Results

1970s
1970

1971

1972

1973

1974

1975

1976

1977

1978

1979

See also
Iraq national football team results

References

External links
Iraq fixtures on eloratings.net
Iraq on soccerway.com

1970s in Iraqi sport
1970